Madisen Ward and the Mama Bear are a mother-and-son folk duo, from Independence, Missouri, United States, consisting of singer-songwriter and guitarist Madisen Ward, and his mother Ruth Ward, who plays guitar and sings with him. The band released their debut album "Skeleton Crew", May 18, 2015 on Glassnote Records. The album was recorded in Nashville, Tennessee and produced by Jim Abbiss. The album reached number 50 on the UK Albums Chart on June 14, 2015.

In 2015, the duo appeared on Late Show with David Letterman, Later... with Jools Holland, BBC Breakfast News, CBS News Sunday Morning, and Today (U.S. TV program). That same year, the band performed in the US, Canada and Europe, including Bonnaroo Music Festival, Newport Folk Festival, Americana Music Festival & Conference. They also supported The Tallest Man on Earth, Sufjan Stevens, Pixies, Rodrigo y Gabriela, and Old Crow Medicine Show. That same year, Madisen Ward and the Mama Bear appeared on NPR Music's Tiny Desk Concert.

The band's second full-length "Started With A Family", was released September 6, 2019. Produced by Nathan Chapman, Engineered by Jeff Balding and Lowell Reynolds, Studio Consultant Rolf Zweip, Mixed by Nathan Chapman, Mastered by Ted Jensen, Sterling Sound. The album was recorded at Blackbird Studios, Nashville TN, in Studio C.

On tour, their backing band consists of Brent Kastler (Bass), Tom Hudson (drums) and Larissa Maestro (Cello).

The duo released The Radio Winners (EP) in July 2018.

References

Folk music duos
American folk musical groups
Musical groups from Kansas City, Missouri
Singer-songwriters from Missouri
Guitarists from Missouri
Glassnote Records artists
Male–female musical duos
Family musical groups
American musical duos